"Hot Shot Tottenham!" was a single released by the English football team Tottenham Hotspur, accompanied by Chas & Dave, to celebrate reaching the 1987 FA Cup Final (which Tottenham lost to Coventry City).  It reached number 18 in the UK Singles Chart.

References

1987 singles
Tottenham Hotspur F.C. songs
Chas & Dave songs
Football songs and chants
Song articles with missing songwriters